Abell 1146 is a rich galaxy cluster in the constellation Crater. Its richness class is 4, and it is located about 2 billion light-years (630 megaparsecs) away.

Its brightest member, PGC 33231, is an elliptical galaxy. It has a redshift of 0.142.

References

External links

1146
Galaxy clusters
Crater (constellation)